Gromphadorhini is a tribe of large, flightless, wood-inhabiting cockroaches comprising 20 known species in 6 genera , all but one from the island of Madagascar; the one exception being from Europa Island just off the coast of Madagascar. They are collectively known as hissing cockroaches, capable of producing sound by forcing air through their abdominal spiracles, and many species are popular in the pet trade, especially the species commonly called "the Madagascar hissing cockroach", Gromphadorhina portentosa. Remarkably, despite their size, 9 of the 20 known species of hissing roaches were not recognized until recently, having only been described in 1973.

As pets

Members of at least four of the genera in the tribe (Aeluropoda, Elliptorhina, Gromphadorhina, and Princisia) are widely kept as exotic pets. Although G. portentosa is considered the best known, and most popular pet,  this is debatable since G. oblongonota and G. picea are commonly confused with it by pet dealers.

References

Cockroaches
Insect tribes